Jhalawar-Baran (झालावाड़-बारां) Lok Sabha constituency is one of the 25 Lok Sabha (parliamentary) constituencies in Rajasthan state in western India. This constituency came into existence in 2008 as a part of the implementation of delimitation of parliamentary constituencies, based on the recommendations of the Delimitation Commission of India constituted in 2002. This constituency covers the entire Jhalawar and Baran districts.

Assembly segments
Presently, Jhalawar–Baran Lok Sabha constituency comprises eight Vidhan Sabha (legislative assembly) segments. These are:

Members of Parliament

Election Results

2019 Lok Sabha

2014 Lok Sabha

2009 Lok Sabha

See also
 Jhalawar (Lok Sabha constituency)
 Jhalawar district
 Baran district
 List of Constituencies of the Lok Sabha

Notes

Lok Sabha constituencies in Rajasthan
Jhalawar district
Baran district
Constituencies established in 2008